Indiana station is a historic railway station located at Indiana, Indiana County, Pennsylvania.  It was built by the Buffalo, Rochester and Pittsburgh Railway in 1904. It is a -story, wood-frame building with weatherboard siding in a railroad vernacular-style.  It features a generous overhang on all four sides.  It housed a restaurant named Tazé until mid-2016.

It was added to the National Register of Historic Places in 1993 as the Buffalo, Rochester & Pittsburgh Railway Indiana Passenger Station.

References

Indiana, Pennsylvania
Transportation buildings and structures in Indiana County, Pennsylvania
Former Baltimore and Ohio Railroad stations
Railway stations in the United States opened in 1904
National Register of Historic Places in Indiana County, Pennsylvania
Railway stations on the National Register of Historic Places in Pennsylvania

Former railway stations in Pennsylvania